The Cursed  is a 2020 South Korean television series starring Uhm Ji-won, Jung Ji-so, Sung Dong-il, and Jo Min-su. It aired on tvN every Monday and Tuesday at 21:30 (KST) from February 10 to March 17, 2020.

Screenwriter Yeon Sang-ho said that he would "go on with season 2 if the viewing rate reaches 3%".

Synopsis
The Cursed is about a teenage girl who has the ability to bring death by using names, photos and belongings, and a just social issues reporter, fighting against the massive evil hidden behind an IT conglomerate.

Cast

Main
 Uhm Ji-won as Im Jin-hee, reporter of the Ministry of Social Affairs.
 Kim Joo-ah as young Im Jin-hee
 Jung Ji-so as Baek So-jin, high school student.
 Sung Dong-il as Jin Jong-hyun, forest chairman.
 Jo Min-su as Jin Kyung, shaman.
Kim Shin-rok as Baek So-jin's mother

Supporting
 Kim Min-jae as Lee Hwan, Jin Jong-hyun's secretary.
 Jung Moon-sung as Jung Sung-joon, Jin-hee's husband.
 Kim In-kwon as Kim Pil-sung, private investigator.
 Lee Joong-ok as Chun Joo-bong	
 Ko Kyu-pil as Tak Jung-hoon

Special appearances
 Choi Byung-mo as Kim Joo-hwan (Ep. 1)
 Kwon Yul as  Lee Jung-hoon (Ep. 4)

Viewership

Awards and nominations

References

External links
  
 
 

TVN (South Korean TV channel) television dramas
Korean-language television shows
2020 South Korean television series debuts
Television series by Studio Dragon
South Korean thriller television series
South Korean mystery television series
2020 South Korean television series endings